Possessed is a 1931 American pre-Code drama film directed by Clarence Brown, starring Joan Crawford and Clark Gable, and released by Metro-Goldwyn-Mayer. The film is the story of Marian Martin, a factory worker who rises to the top as the mistress of a wealthy attorney. The screenplay by Lenore J. Coffee was adapted from the 1920 Broadway play The Mirage by Edgar Selwyn. Possessed was the third of eight movie collaborations between Crawford and Gable.

Plot
Marian Martin (Joan Crawford) is a factory girl living with her mother in the working class section of Erie, Pennsylvania. Factory boy Al Manning (Wallace Ford) hopes to marry her, but Marian is determined to find a better life. When a train makes a stop in town, Marian looks through the windows and sees the wealthy passengers. She then makes the acquaintance of one of the train passengers, Wally Stuart (Richard "Skeets" Gallagher), a New Yorker who gives her champagne and writes down his address, telling her to look him up if she ever makes it to New York. Marian, now tipsy from the champagne, happily returns home. Giggling, she tells Al and her mother that she was drinking down by the railroad tracks.

Al, who was waiting for her and accuses her of being drunk, spots the piece of paper containing Wally's address in Marian's hand, grabs it from her, and tears it up. He then tells Marian that her actions are inappropriate and that she's staying with him. Marian lashes out, telling Al and her mother that no one owns her and that her life belongs to herself. She grabs the torn paper shreds up from the floor and pastes them back together, then leaves for New York City. There, she looks up Wally who gives her some advice on meeting and keeping wealthy men, which Marian uses to begin a relationship with his friend Mark Whitney (Clark Gable), a divorced attorney.

She eventually becomes Mark's mistress and he provides her with a complete make-over, educating her in the arts and culture of his social set. Three years pass and the two entertain with brio and style. Marian and Mark fall in love. To cover the fact of Marian being his kept woman, Mark devises a made-up back story of her being "Mrs. Moreland", a wealthy divorcee living comfortably off her alimony.

Some time later, Al, now running a prosperous cement business, comes to the city hoping to land a big contract. He sees Marian and asks her to marry him, but she refuses. When Al learns that Marian is friends with Mark, Al hopes he can use Mark to help land that contract. Al has no idea of Marian and Mark's true relationship. When Mark decides to run for gubernatorial office, however, friends caution him that his relationship with Marian is a serious liability. When she overhears Mark talking with some politicians, she learns that he now plans to marry her, despite the fact that their relationship would cause a scandal. To support his gubernatorial bid, she lies to Mark, telling him that she no longer loves him. She tells him that she is going to marry Al instead.

Marian decides to tell Al the truth. He rebuffs her, saying that he could never marry such a woman. He changes his mind when he realizes that in shutting her out of his life, he is also burning his bridges with Mark and that highway contract.

A political rival learns of Marian's true identity and plans to leak that information at one of Mark's political rallies. At that rally, Mark has the crowd generally on his side. No one is aware that Marian is in the audience. His political rivals then drop shards of paper from the auditorium ceiling, each piece of paper with the text, "Who is Mrs. Moreland?" written on it. Seeing that text on the paper, Mark has a worried look on his face, he not knowing what to do. As the crowd rumbles, Marian steps up from the audience and tells them that she is Mrs. Moreland, and that Mark has always been an honorable man, who once belonged to her, but now belongs to them. The crowd cheers as she, sobbing, leaves. Outside, Mark catches up to her and tells her that from now on they will be together no matter what. Mark legitimizes their relationship by proposing marriage.

Cast

 Joan Crawford as Marian Martin
 Clark Gable as Mark Whitney
 Wallace Ford as Al Manning
 Richard "Skeets" Gallagher as Wally Stuart (billed as Skeets Gallagher)
 Frank Conroy as Horace Travers
 Marjorie White as Vernice LaVerne
 John Miljan as John Driscoll
 Clara Blandick as Marian's mother
Uncredited Cast
 Norman Ainsley as Ambrose - Wally's Butler 
 Jack Baxley as 'League of Nations' Heckler 
 Wade Boteler as 'Answer That One' Heckler 
 Clarence Brown as Man on Merry-Go-Round
 André Cheron as Monsieur Lavell - Party Guest 
 Gino Corrado as Signor Martini - Party Guest 
 Phyllis Crane as Undetermined Secondary Role
 Jean Del Val as Waiter 
 Florence Enright as Undetermined Secondary Role 
 Bess Flowers as Party Guest 
 Francis Ford as Drunken Husband 
 Mary Gordon as Woman at Political Rally 
 James T. Mack as Elevator Operator 
 Fred Malatesta as Party Waiter 
 Alphonse Martell as French Waiter 
 Wilfred Noy as Bertram - Mark's Butler 
 Jack Pennick as 'Parole for Convicts' Heckler 
 Ruth Renick as Undetermined Secondary Role 
 Joan Standing as Whitney's Secretary 
 Larry Steers as Party Guest 
 Barbara Tennant as Undetermined Secondary Role
 Wilhelm von Brincken as Baron von Bergen - Party Guest 
 Walter Walker as Whitney for Governor Supporter

Reception
Critic Mordaunt Hall, writing for The New York Times, liked the film and the direction of Clarence Brown.  He wrote:

Through Clarence Brown's able direction, handsome settings and a fairly well-written script, "Possessed,"... is a gratifying entertainment. ... The familiar theme of a small-town factory girl who becomes the mistress of a wealthy New Yorker is set forth with new ideas which result in surprises, if not in a measure of suspense.

Box office
According to MGM records the film earned $1,030,000 in the US and Canada and $492,000 elsewhere resulting in a profit of $611,000.

References

External links

 
 
 
 
 

1931 drama films
1931 films
American black-and-white films
American films based on plays
Films directed by Clarence Brown
Films produced by Irving Thalberg
Metro-Goldwyn-Mayer films
Films produced by Harry Rapf
American drama films
1930s English-language films
1930s American films